In psychology the light triad scale quantifies empathy, compassion and altruism.  The idea was first suggested by Laura Johnson in her 2018 masters thesis. Together these are considered as being the light triad. 

The light triad scale assesses people by their responses to statements like:
 I think people are mostly good.
 I enjoy listening to people from all walks of life.
 When I talk to people, I am rarely thinking about what I want from them.

The light triad was inspired by the more established dark triad which assesses negative personality and thoughts.  It was expected that the light triad would be highly anticorrelated with the dark triad.  That is, a high score on the light triad would correspond to a low score on the dark triad and vice versa.  However researchers found that the two were only moderately anticorrelated at −0.48, showing that they are not merely opposites.

References

Further reading
 Glenn Geher, "The light triad of personality", Psychology Today, 12 March 2019.

Empathy
Altruism